The 1985 Walker Cup, the 30th Walker Cup Match, was played on August 21 and 22, 1985, at Pine Valley Golf Club, Pine Valley, New Jersey. The event was won by the United States 13 to 11.

Format
The format for play on Wednesday and Thursday was the same. There were four matches of foursomes in the morning and eight singles matches in the afternoon. In all, 24 matches were played.

Each of the 24 matches was worth one point in the larger team competition. If a match was all square after the 18th hole extra holes were not played. Rather, each side earned ½ a point toward their team total. The team that accumulated at least 12½ points won the competition. If the two teams were tied, the previous winner would retain the trophy.

Teams
Ten players for the United States and Great Britain & Ireland participated in the event. The United States had a playing captain, while Great Britain & Ireland had a non-playing captain.

United States

Playing captain: Jay Sigel
Clark Burroughs
Jerry Haas
Bob Lewis
Davis Love III
Mike Podolak
Sam Randolph
Randy Sonnier
Scott Verplank
Duffy Waldorf

Great Britain & Ireland
 & 
Captain:  Charlie Green
 Peter Baker
 Cecil Bloice
 David Gilford
 John Hawksworth
 George Macgregor
 Paul Mayo
 Peter McEvoy
 Garth McGimpsey
 Colin Montgomerie
 Sandy Stephen

Wednesday's matches

Morning foursomes

Afternoon singles

Thursday's matches

Morning foursomes

Afternoon singles

References

Walker Cup
Golf in New Jersey
Walker Cup
Walker Cup
Walker Cup